Hati Rural District is a rural district (dehestan) in Hati District, Lali County, Khuzestan Province, Iran. At the 2006 census, its population was 5,121, in 856 families.  The rural district has 47 villages.

References 

Rural Districts of Khuzestan Province
Lali County